The 1996–97 NCAA Division I men's basketball season concluded in the 64-team 1997 NCAA Division I men's basketball tournament whose finals were held at the RCA Dome in Indianapolis, Indiana. The Arizona Wildcats earned their first national championship by defeating the Kentucky Wildcats 84–79 on March 31, 1997. They were coached by Lute Olsen and the NCAA basketball tournament Most Outstanding Player was Arizona's Miles Simon.

In the 32-team 1997 National Invitation Tournament, the Michigan Wolverines defeated the Florida State Seminoles at Madison Square Garden in New York City. Michigan later vacated the 1997 NIT title after Robert Traylor and Louis Bullock were ruled ineligible.

Following the season, the 1997 NCAA Men's Basketball All-American Consensus First team included Tim Duncan, Danny Fortson, Raef LaFrentz, Ron Mercer, and Keith Van Horn.

Season headlines 
 Lute Olsen led the Arizona Wildcats to its first National Championship.

Pre-season polls 
The top 25 from the pre-season AP Poll.

Conference membership changes 

These schools joined new conferences for the 1996–97 season.

Regular season

Conference winners and tournaments 
27 conference seasons concluded with a single-elimination tournament, with only the Big Ten Conference, Ivy League and the Pac-10 Conference choosing not to conduct conference tournaments. Conference tournament winners received an automatic bid to the NCAA tournament.

Statistical leaders

Post-season tournaments

NCAA tournament

Final Four – RCA Dome, Indianapolis, Indiana

National Invitation tournament

Semifinals & finals 

 Third Place - Connecticut 74, Arkansas 64

Michigan later forfeited its entire 1996–97 schedule after Robert Traylor, Maurice Taylor and Louis Bullock were found to have taken money from a Michigan booster.

Award winners

Consensus All-American teams

Major player of the year awards 
 Wooden Award: Tim Duncan, Wake Forest
 Naismith Award: Tim Duncan, Wake Forest
 Associated Press Player of the Year: Tim Duncan, Wake Forest
 NABC Player of the Year: Tim Duncan, Wake Forest
 Oscar Robertson Trophy (USBWA): Tim Duncan, Wake Forest
 Adolph Rupp Trophy: Tim Duncan, Wake Forest
 Sporting News Player of the Year: Tim Duncan, Wake Forest
 Chip Hilton Player of the Year Award: Tim Duncan, Wake Forest

Major freshman of the year awards 
 USBWA Freshman of the Year: No Award Given
 Sporting News Freshman of the Year: No Award Given

Major coach of the year awards 
 Associated Press Coach of the Year: Clem Haskins, Minnesota (Vacated)
 Henry Iba Award (USBWA): Clem Haskins, Minnesota (Vacated)
 NABC Coach of the Year: Clem Haskins, Minnesota (Vacated)
 Naismith College Coach of the Year: Roy Williams, Kansas
 Sporting News Coach of the Year: Roy Williams, Kansas
 Clair Bee Coach of the Year Award: Clem Haskins, Minnesota (Vacated)

Other major awards 
 NABC Defensive Player of the Year: Tim Duncan, Wake Forest
 Frances Pomeroy Naismith Award (Best player under 6'0): Brevin Knight, Stanford
 Robert V. Geasey Trophy (Top player in Philadelphia Big 5): Rashid Bey, St. Joseph's
 NIT/Haggerty Award (Top player in New York City metro area): Charles Jones, Long Island
 Chip Hilton Player of the Year Award (Strong personal character): Tim Duncan, Wake Forest

Coaching changes 

A number of teams changed coaches during the season and after it ended.

References